The 1982 North Carolina Tar Heels football team represented the University of North Carolina at Chapel Hill during the 1982 NCAA Division I-A football season. The Tar Heels were led by fifth-year head coach Dick Crum and played their home games at Kenan Memorial Stadium in Chapel Hill, North Carolina. They competed as members of the Atlantic Coast Conference and finished tied for third place.

Schedule

References

North Carolina
North Carolina Tar Heels football seasons
Sun Bowl champion seasons
North Carolina Tar Heels football